Kish International Airport  (Fervadgâh-e Bin Almilli-ye Kish) is an international airport on Kish Island, Iran.

Description 
The Kish International Airport serves as the entry point for the hundreds of thousands of tourists who come to Kish Island. The airport grants 14-day visa-free entry foreign citizens who enter from a foreign country under a different scheme from that of mainland Iran.

Prior to the Iranian Revolution, Iran had an outstanding order for two Concorde aircraft. These aircraft were supposed to be used on Kish-Paris and Kish-London routes to serve the luxury tourism market that Kish was supposed to serve. The airport had been designed to handle Concorde's landings and take-offs.

History 
In the 1980s, the Kish Free Zone Organisation (KFZO) was created. It offered visa-free travels to the islands for foreigners, and 15-year tax exemptions to foreign investors. The plan was to compete with Dubai's attractiveness for international business.  The plan failed as the airport was mainly served by Iranian airlines. It became mainly used by Iranians coming to enjoy the looser rules of the island.

In 1998, the 11-month construction of Terminal 5 started, covering a 5,500 square meters area, with a budget of RIs 2,245 million financed by the Organization of Kish Free Trade Zone (FTZ).

In 2015, under the leadership of the Organization of Kish Free Trade Zone (FTZ), a new terminal is planned for construction. The new terminal would turn Kish International Airport into the second-largest airport of the country with a 4.5 million passengers capacity per year. 2.7 million passengers travelled through the airport that year.

Airlines and destinations

Iran Kish Air Show 
The Kish International Airport is the main host of the Iran Kish Air Show, the aviation airshow held biennially.

See also
Iran Civil Aviation Organization
Transport in Iran
List of airports in Iran
List of the busiest airports in Iran
List of airlines of Iran
Kish Island
Iran

References

External links

  Kish International Airport
See the Kish Air Agency (bodokish.com)

Airports in Iran
Kish Island
Buildings and structures in Hormozgan Province
Transportation in Hormozgan Province